Iskandar Yagub oglu Shirali November 21, 1960, – the head of Integrated Drilling Trust of the State Oil Company of Azerbaijan Republic (SOCAR) (2007), the doctor of science (2014), the Corresponding member of the Russian Academy of Engineering (RAE) (2014), professor of Gas, Petroleum and Mining Faculty of Azerbaijan State Oil and Industry University (2015).

General information
 Was born in the village of Novovasilyevka of Neftechala region.  
 Graduated from Azerbaijani Institute of Oil and Chemistry named after M. Azizbayov from specialty "Mining engineer" (diploma with honors) (1983).  
 Married, has 4 children and 4 grandchildren.

Scientific activity
I.Shirali began to work in 1983 as a driller assistant in Caspian Oil Production Association of the Sangachal Offshore Drilling Administration. In 1984 he worked as a head of this department, and in 1990 he was appointed as a deputy head of the engineering department of the 2nd division. In 1991–1992, I. Shirali worked as a head of Baku branch of 'Zond' manufacturing enterprise in St. Petersburg. Since 1992, he started to work as chief engineer in Qum Adasi offshore drilling department, and since 1993 already the head of department, since 2006-as a head of the Absheron drilling department. He is a general manager of SOCAR Complex Drilling Works Trust since 2007. 
In 2001 he received degree of Candidate of Technical Sciences and a doctor's degree in 2014.  Since 2014 he is a Corresponding member of the Russian Academy of Engineering, since 2015 – professor at the Petroleum-Gas and Mining Faculty of Azerbaijan State Oil and Industry University. 
Iskandar Shirali is an author of 71 scientific works, 9 patents, 9 monographs, 8 textbooks.

Career
During his career as a general manager at SOCAR Complex Drilling Works Trust, they drilled the giant gas field and handed over to customer – Umid field in 2010. The trust also had a special role in the discovery of such a giant field – Bulla Deniz gas field. Today the extensive drilling works  of the fields as Gunashli, Western Absheron, the field of Neft Dashlari and gas storages in the Qaradagh District of Baku are continued under the leadership of Iskandar Shirali.  
I. Shirali is the author of many theories and methods in drilling field. With him, Complex Drilling Works Trust drilled horizontal well on the Pirallahi field.

Awards
 "Honorary Degree" of SOCAR (2010)
 The Taraggi Medal (2011)
 The title "Honorary Engineer" (2012)
 Third Class "Labor" Order (2017)

Patents
 I.Ya. Shirali — Two chamber viscoplastic sealing packer. Patent No. 20090221, 2009.
 I.Ya. Shirali — the Calibrator of installation of mechanisms with high performance. Patent No. a20090201, 2009.
 I.Ya. Shirali — the Way of drilling at directional drilling of horizontal trunks Patent No. a20090270, 2009.
 I.Ya. Shirali — the Drill with two-level hydromonitor effect. Patent No. a020100003, 2010.
 I.Ya. Shirali, Amirova R.G. of Gülglizli AS, Abbasov S. A.,kh. Gasanov — the Segmented flange connections. Patent No. 20060254.

Names of scientific works
 İskəndər Şirəli, R.İbrahimov,S.Rzazadə,Ş.Bəxşəliyeva,A.Məmmədov - Neft-qaz quyularının qazılmasının texnikası və texnoloqiyası  "ELM"2020 il., 696 s.(Azerbaijan edition) – 
 Ширали Искандер, С.Рзазаде, Р.Ибрагимов, Ш.Бахшалиева, З.Ибрагимов – Предупреждение и ликвидация Газонфтеводо проявления и фонтанов при бурении скважин в сложных геологических условиях. "ЭЛМ"2020 г., 448 с.(Russian Edition), Учебник Противо выбросное оборудование – 
 İskəndər Şirəli - Neftqaz mühəndisliyinin müasir probləri. "ELM"2019 il., 496 s.(Azerbaijan edition) – 
 Ширали Искандер, Гасанов Рамиз – Бурение скважин: Инновационная техника и технология (Russian Edition) LAP Lambert Academic Publishing (February 13, 2015)[10] – 
 Hasanov, R.A., Shirali, I.Y., Ramazanov, F.A., Zeynalov, A.I, Kazimov, M.I., Musevi, S.A., Gasimova, T.M. and Babaev, A.M. International Journal of Development Research MODELLING OF MECHANICAL PERFORMANCES FOR PLANAR SOFC DEVELOPMENT
 Ширали И. Я. О механизме самопроизвольного искривления трассы наклонного ствола при бурении забойными двигателями. Сборник тезисов республиканской конференции молодых ученых и аспирантов Баку, АГНА.
 Ширали И. Я. Новые технические разработки элементов КНБК. Баку, Чашыоглы, 2000, 147с.
 Ширали И. Я. Оптимизация геометрии режущих элементов вооружения породоразрушающего инструмента. Международная конференции Породоразрушающий и металообрабатывающий инструмент-техника и технология его изготовления и применения. (18–25) 06.2010, вып.13, Киев Украина.
 Ширали И. Я. Оптимизация профиля промывочных насадок породоразрушающих инструментов. Международная конференции Породоразрушающий и металообрабатывающий инструмент-техника и технология его изготовления и применения. (18–25) 06.2010, вып.13, Киев Украина.
 Ширали И. Я. Породоразрушающие инструменты и пути их модернизации. Баку, АГНА, 2011 г.
 Ширали И. Я. Бурение наклонно-направленных скважин с горизонтальным окончанием. Баку, АГНА, 2011, часть I
 Ширали И. Я. Бурение наклонно-направленных скважин с горизонтальным окончанием. Баку, АГНА, 2011, часть II
 Ширали И. Я. Оценка работоспособности бурового машинного агрегата. Баку, АГНА, 2011г.
 Ширали И. Я. Разработка нового параметрического ряда магнитных ловителей на основе энергетических магнитных захватных механизмов. Международная конференция «Нефть и Газ Западной Сибири». Том III.(20÷22).10.2011.
 Ширали И. Я. Обратный метод оценки энергоемкости разрушения пород при забойной зоны с учетом показателей их свойств. ADNA, “ Neftin , qazın geotexnoloji problemləri və kimya “ . XII cild, Bakı, 2011.
 Ширали И. Я. Влияние реомеханических свойств горых пород на энергоемкость их разрушения. ADNA, “ Neftin , qazın geotexnoloji problemləri və kimya “ . XII cild, Bakı, 2011.
 Ширали И. Я. Разработка и внедрение механизма для создания дополнительной нагрузки на буровой машинный агрегат. Журнал « Азербайджанское Нефтяное Хозяйство» (АНХ) Qəbul edilib 11.2011.
 Ширали И. Я. Исследование устойчивости окружающего массива пород стенок горизонтального ствола наклонно-направленных скважин. Москва, Специализированный журнал «Бурение и Нефть». 01.2012.
 Ширали И. Я. Разработка методов расчета участков профилей наклонно-направленных скважин по результатам анализа промыслово-статической информации.
 Ширали И. Я. Разработка и исследовании опорноцентрирующего устройства низа бурильной колонны для проводки ствола наклонно-направленных скважин. Труды международной научно-технической конференции «Научные проблемы Заподно-Сибирского нефтегазового региона: гуманитарные естественные и технические аспекты» Тюмень 1999, с.60–61.
 Разработка и внедрение новых технических средств и технологии для улучшения показателей бурения
 Şirəli İ.Y. Maili quyu lüləsində yönəldilməyən qazma kəmərinin aşağı hissəsinin tədqiqi. ADNA,Elmi əsərlər, No.3, 1998.
 Şirəli İ.Y., Sadıqov S.X. Homeopatiyanın ikinci prinsipini tətbiq etməklə qazıma məhlulunun ilk kimyəvi işlənməsi. Dövlət elm və texnika komitəsi, Elm və texnikanın yenilikləri No. 1 (5), 2001
 Şirəli İ.Y., Sadıqov S.X. Neft və qaz quyularının qazılmasında məhlulların kimyəvi işlənməsi zamanı ehtiyatlara qənaətli texnologiyanın tətbiqi. Faktor-4 elmi-təcrübi konfransın məruzələr toplusu, Bakı-2001.
 Şirəli İ.Y. İstinad mərkəzləşdirici elementsiz qazma kəmərinin aşağı hissəsinin tədqiqi. ADNA, Elmi əsərlər,1998 No.8 s21-27
 Şirəli İsgəndər Yaqub oğlu-Renovasiya texnologiyalarının quyudaxili alət və avadanlıqları (tutucu alətləri), dərs vəsaiti, 2015
 Şirəli İsgəndər Yaqub oğlu-Renovasiya texnologiyalarının quyudaxili alət və avadanlıqları (suxurdağıdıcı alət və avadanlıqlar), dərs vəsaiti, 2015
 Azərbaycan Mühəndislik Akademiyasının jurnalı (Dənizdə yerləşən "Ümid-12" quyusunun yan lüləsinin mürəkkəb geoloji şəraitdə böyük diametrli quyruq kəməri ilə birləşdirilməsi təcrübəsi)
 Azərbaycan Neft təsərufatı jurnalı (Перспективы нефтегазоносности нижнего отдела продуктивной толщи в свете новых данных, полученных на месторождении Булла-Дениз)

External links
İstehsalat təcrübəsi keçirilən müəssisələr
BANM ilə “Kompleks Qazma İşləri” tresti arasında əməkdaşlıq haqqında razılaşma imzalanıb

References

1960 births
Living people
Academic staff of Azerbaijan State Oil and Industry University
Azerbaijani engineers
People from Neftchala District